"Until I Found You" is a song by American singer-songwriter Stephen Sanchez. It was released on September 1, 2021 as the lead single from Sanchez's second extended play Easy on My Eyes. Written by Sanchez and produced by Ian Fitchuk and Konrad Snyder, the song peaked at number 23 on the Billboard Hot 100 and at number 16 on the UK Singles Chart.

Background
Originally released on September 1, 2021, by Republic Records and Mercury Records, the song received viral support on TikTok. Sanchez explained that the addressee "Georgia" refers to his real life girlfriend, who he had previously distanced himself from.

On April 22, 2022, a remix of the song was released along with American singer-songwriter Em Beihold.

Live performances 
Sanchez performed the song on Late Night with Seth Meyers in May 2022, June 2022 on The Late Show with Stephen Colbert,  and in February 2023 with Em Beihold on The Late Late Show with James Corden.

Composition

Music video
The music video was officially uploaded to Sanchez's YouTube channel on June 29, 2022. The synopsis of the music video sees Sanchez singing in a convertible car while a Marilyn Monroe-esque ingénue (Jeri Mae James) sits on the back of the car before switching scenes on the TV set.

Usage in media
In 2023, the remix version of the song featuring Em Beihold was featured in two episodes of season 2 of the Netflix original series, Ginny & Georgia.

On February 10, 2023, Korean-New Zealand singer Rosé from South Korean girl group Blackpink released a cover of the song in honor of her birthday. The cover peaked at number one on Billboards Hot Trending Songs chart, and the original version concurrently rose 8% in U.S. streams during the same week.

Charts

Weekly charts

Year-end charts

Certifications

References

External links
"Until I Found You" (Em Beihold version) on YouTube

2021 singles
2021 songs
Em Beihold songs
Number-one singles in Malaysia
Republic Records singles
Mercury Records singles
Song recordings produced by Ian Fitchuk
Songs written by Em Beihold